The 1996–97 Israeli Hockey League season was the sixth season of Israel's hockey league. The Lions Jerusalem won the league title for the second straight year.

External links
Season on hockeyarchives.info

Israeli League
Israeli League (ice hockey) seasons
Seasons